Zirconium lactate is the zirconium salt of lactic acid. It is used in some deodorants. Zirconium carboxylates adopt highly complex structures and are heterogeneous compositions with the approximate formula Zr(OH)4-n(O2CCHOHCH3)n(H2O)x where 1 < n < 3.

Uses
It is also used in the petroleum industry as a cross-linking agent to prepare gels for fracturing fluids, fluids which are pumped into an oil-bearing rock formation to cause cracks in the rock and so to allow the oil to be extracted. It may be prepared by treating zirconium oxide with lactic acid.

Physical properties
It is a colourless solid.

Safety
Its  >10 g/kg). It is suspected of causing zirconium granulomas (a form of skin irritation) in a small number of users.

References 

Lactates
Zirconium(IV) compounds